The tennis competitions at the 2003 Afro-Asian Games in Hyderabad, India were held from October 25 to October 31 at the SAAP Tennis Complex. The events were held on grass courts.

All semifinal losers were awarded bronze medal. India was the most successful- it won gold medals in each tennis event. Then-16-year-old and rising Indian star on the professional tennis court, Sania Mirza, was the most victorious, winning four gold medals.

Men's singles

Medalists

Seeds

 Prakash Amritraj (Quarterfinals, withdrew)
 Vijay Kannan (Champion, Gold Medalist)

3.   Joseph Victorino (Quarterfinals)
4.   Abdul-Mumin Babalola (Quarterfinals)

Finals

Main draw

Men's doubles

Medalists

Seeds

 Mahesh Bhupathi /  Rohan Bopanna (Champions, Gold Medalists)
 Sunil-Kumar Sipaeya /  Vinod Sridhar (Final, Silver Medalists)

3.   Adelo Abadia /  Johnny Arcilla (Semifinals, Bronze Medalists)
4.   Abdul-Mumin Babalola /  Sunday Maku (Semifinals, Bronze Medalists)

Main draw
 Only four teams in the draw

Women's singles

Medalists

Seeds

 Sania Mirza (Champion, Gold Medalist)
 Rushmi Chakravarthi (Final, Silver Medalist)

3.   Sandy Gumulya (Semifinals, Bronze Medalist)
4.   Septi Mende (Quarterfinals)

Finals

Main draw

Women's doubles

Medalists

Seeds

 Rushmi Chakravarthi /  Sania Mirza (Champions, Gold Medalists)
 Sonal Phadke /  Meghha Vakaria (Semifinals, Bronze Medalists)

3.   Septi Mende /  Maya Rosa Ariana Stefanie (Final, Silver Medalists)
4.   Czarina Arevalo /  Anna-Patricia Santos (Semifinals, Bronze Medalists)

Main draw
 Only six teams in the draw

Mixed doubles

Medalists

Seeds

 Sania Mirza /  Mahesh Bhupathi (Champions, Gold Medalists)
 Rushmi Chakravarthi  /  Vishal Uppal (Final, Silver Medalists)

3.   Czarina Arevalo /  Adelo Abadia (Semifinals, Bronze Medalists)
4.   Anna-Patricia Santos /  Johnny Arcilla (Semifinals, Bronze Medalists)

Main draw
 Only six teams in the draw

Men's team

Medalists

Draw

Women's team

Medalists

Draw

References

 http://www.its.uci.edu/~jaykay/tenn-results/afro-asian-hyd-1003.html

2003 Afro-Asian Games
2003 in tennis
Tennis tournaments in India